William Emmette Coleman (June 19, 1843 – April 4, 1909), also known as W. E. Coleman, was an American clerk, Orientalist, spiritualist and writer.

Biography
Coleman was born in Shadwell, Virginia. He was an assistant librarian of Richmond Public Library (1854–1857). He became a spiritualist at age sixteen. He married Wilmot Bouton in 1871; she died in 1882. In 1869 he became assistant chief clerk for General Canby. He was made chief clerk in the Quartermaster office at the Presidio of San Francisco in 1883.

Coleman is best remembered for his criticism of Helena Blavatsky and the claims of Theosophy. He argued in his writings that Blavatsky had plagiarized her ideas from other sources and had stolen quotations. His article "The Sources of Madame Blavatsky's Writings" was published in an appendix to Vsevolod Solovyov's A Modern Priestess of Isis (1895). He also claimed he was working on a book that would expose Blavatsky's sources for her Book of Dzyan but his notes were destroyed in the 1906 San Francisco earthquake and the book was never published.

Coleman has been described as a "radical non-Christian spiritualist". He opposed slavery and supported the separation of church and state. He was a member of the American Oriental Society and the Royal Asiatic Society of Great Britain and Ireland.

He died in Alameda, California on April 4, 1909.

Publications

Articles
 The Frauds of Madame Blavatsky (1891) 
 Blavatsky Unveiled (1892)
 Critical Historical Review of The Theosophical Society (1893)
 The Sources of Madame Blavatsky's Writings (1895)

Booklets
The Bible God Disproved by Nature (Truthseeker Tracts, no. 55) 
One Hundred and One Reasons Why I am not a Christian Spiritualist (Truthseeker Tracts no. 79)

See also
Fydell Edmund Garrett

References

1843 births
1909 deaths
People from Albemarle County, Virginia
Writers from Virginia
American orientalists
American spiritualists
Clerks
Critics of Theosophy
American parapsychologists